Jacob Worm-Müller (15 May 1866 – 6 May 1911) was a Norwegian author and journalist.

He was born in Bergen as a son of ship-owner Bernt Ulrich August Müller and Amalie, née Alver. His mother later remarried as Amalie Skram and became one of Norway's best-known authors. After Jacob Worm-Müller finished his secondary education in 1884, he studied law, but mixed with the Kristiania Bohemians and was subsequently then sent by his mother to Copenhagen. He returned to Norway in 1894. He married Emmy Helene Hornemann, who became an actress.

Jacob Worm-Müller issued the novels Fire dage ("Four Days", 1894) and Stormen ("The Tempest", 1895), both on the publishing house Gyldendal. As a journalist he wrote for several newspapers, often espousing a zealous attitude, for instance in his support of the Boers in the Boer War. Late in his life he converted to Roman Catholicism. While working several years in Dagbladet, this newspaper's obituary noted that Worm-Müller had become "reactionary", in "both social as well as religious" aspects. His last newspaper was Ørebladet. He died following a surgery at the age of 45.

References

1866 births
1911 deaths
Writers from Bergen
Norwegian expatriates in Denmark
Norwegian novelists
Norwegian journalists
Dagbladet people
20th-century Norwegian novelists
Norwegian Roman Catholics
Converts to Roman Catholicism